Ormideia FC is a Cypriot football club based in Ormideia. Founded in 2006, was playing sometimes in Third and in Fourth Division.

Honours
 Cypriot Fourth Division:
 Champions (1): 2011

References

External links

 Team profile at Cyprus Football Association website  

Football clubs in Cyprus
Association football clubs established in 2006
2006 establishments in Cyprus
Football clubs in Larnaca